Puri Oil Mills Limited is an Indian public limited company manufacturing Mustard Oil along with a wide range of mustard-based value-added products under the registered brand name of P Mark Mustard Oil. The company has its corporate headquarters in New Delhi, India. The company's product portfolio is marketed across Jammu and Kashmir, Himachal Pradesh, Haryana, Uttar Pradesh, Punjab, Uttarakhand, Delhi, Bihar and Odisha (Orissa). The brand P Mark Mustard Oil was established in 1933. Puri Oil Mills Limited has three manufacturing facilities, located at Moga in Punjab, Damtal in Himachal Pradesh and Bahadurgarh in Haryana. The company also manufactures and markets cattle-feed under the same brand name.

The company has also diversified into small and medium-sized hydro power plants in the states of Haryana and Himachal Pradesh.

The well-known Bollywood character actor Boman Irani is currently the brand ambassador for P Mark Mustard Oil.

History
The business started out as an SME under the name of Devi Dass Gopal Kishan in Moga, and was later incorporated as DDGK Limited. As part of a merger, this company became a unit of Puri Oil Mills Limited.

Products and services
Brand P Mark is positioned as "The Mustard Specialist" and manufactures cold-pressed Mustard Oil along with an array of mustard-based value-added products.

Brands
 P Mark Cold Pressed Mustard Oil
 P Mark Light Mustard Oil
 P Mark Organic Mustard Oil
P Mark Fortified Mustard Oil
Allied Products
 P Mark Ghee
 P Mark Vegetable Refined Oil
 Shakti Massage Oil

Employees
As of 2013, the company has 565 employees.

References

Food and drink companies based in Delhi
Manufacturing companies based in Delhi
Companies based in New Delhi